Nadine Schmutzler (born 27 April 1984 in Herdecke) is a German rower.

References 
 
 

1984 births
Living people
German female rowers
People from Herdecke
Sportspeople from Arnsberg (region)
Olympic rowers of Germany
Rowers at the 2008 Summer Olympics
World Rowing Championships medalists for Germany
European Rowing Championships medalists
20th-century German women
21st-century German women